M. Hakan Yavuz (born 24 April 1964) is a Turkish political scientist and  historian, a scholar of contemporary Islamic and Turkish studies.

Early life and education 
Yavuz was born in Bayburt, Turkey in 1964. Kazım Yavuz, his father, was a political activist and teacher who was graduated from the Ernis (Van) Village Institutes and led numerous cooperative projects to develop rural area economy and infrastructure. Yavuz obtained his Bachelor of Arts in political science at Faculty of Political Science, Ankara University (Mektep-i Mülkiye) in 1987. He received his master's from the University of Wisconsin-Milwaukee. He spent one semester in 1989 at the Hebrew University of Jerusalem to complete his master thesis that compared the works of Michael Oakeshott and Michael Walzer. He earned his Ph.D. in political science from the University of Wisconsin-Madison in 1998. He received a two-year MacArthur Foundation scholarship to carry out research on the localization of Islam in the Fergana Valley of Uzbekistan as well as in eastern Turkey. His dissertation titled Islamic Political Identity in Turkey was published by the Oxford University Press in 2003.

Academic career 
Yavuz began his academic career at Bilkent University in 1996 while he was completing his dissertation. After spending one year there, he joined the University of Utah as an assistant professor in 1998. He held a joint appointment in the university's Department of Political Science and the Middle East Center. Yavuz was a Kroc Institute For International Peace Study Fellow at the University of Notre Dame in 2001 followed by his one-year fellowship at the University of California-Irvine in 2000. He taught as a visiting professor at Sarajevo University in Bosnia, Waseda University in Tokyo, Manas University in Biskek, and the Central European University in Budapest.

Since 2009, Yavuz runs the Turkish Studies Project funded by Turkish Coalition of America, one of whose main purposes is to reject the conventional interpretation of the Armenian genocide. Yavuz wrote that "there was no genocide, but rather local responses to the Armenian provocations, the guerrilla tactics on the side of the occupying Russian army, and the rebellions in different parts of Anatolia".

Publications

Authored books 
 
Erdoğan: The Making of an Autocrat (Edinburgh University Press, 2021). 
Islamic Political Identity in Turkey (Oxford University Press, 2003; 2005).
Secularism and Muslim Democracy in Turkey (Cambridge: Cambridge University Press, 2009).
Toward and Islamic Enlightenment: The Gülen Movement (New York: Oxford University Press, 2013).

Edited books 
Yavuz is co-editor of a three-volume edition on the disintegration of the Ottoman Empire:
 with Peter Sluglett, eds., War and Diplomacy: The Russo-Turkish War of 1877-1878 and the Treaty of Berlin (Salt Lake City: The University of Utah Press, 2011). 
 with Isa Blumi, eds., War and Nationalism: The Balkan Wars, 1912–1913, and Their Sociopolitical Implications (Salt Lake City: The University of Utah Press, 2013). 
 with Feroz Ahmad, eds, War and Collapse: World War I and the Ottoman State (Salt Lake City: The University of Utah Press, 2015). 

His other edited books include: 
 with Bayram Balci, eds. Turkey’s July 15th Coup: What Happened and Why? (Salt Lake City: The University of Utah Press, 2017).
The Emergence of a New Turkey: Democracy and AK Parti (Salt Lake City: The University of Utah Press, 2006).
 with John Esposito eds., Turkish Islam and the Secular State: The Gülen Movement (Syracuse University Press, 2003).
with Ahmet Erdi Ozturk eds., Islam, Populism and Regime Change in Turkey: Making and Re-making the AKP (Routledge, 2020).

References

1964 births
Living people
People from Bayburt
University of Wisconsin–Milwaukee alumni
Turkish writers
Turkish political scientists
Deniers of the Armenian genocide